Felipe Aspegren (born 12 February 1994) is a Finnish football player who plays for Veikkausliiga side SJK. Born in Colombia, he plays for the Finland national team.

Early life
Born in Cali, Colombia, Aspegren was six years old when he and his younger brother Brayan were both adopted to Helsinki, Finland.

Club career
On 10 August 2021, he moved to KuPS until the end of the 2021 season with an option for 2022.

On 18 July 2022, Aspegren returned to SJK until the end of the season.

Honours

Individual
Veikkausliiga Team of the Year: 2019

External links
  Profile at Veikkausliiga's website

References

1994 births
Living people
Footballers from Cali
Finnish footballers
Finland international footballers
Finland youth international footballers
Colombian footballers
Colombian emigrants
Finnish adoptees
Finnish people of Colombian descent
People with acquired Finnish citizenship
Association football defenders
Klubi 04 players
FC Inter Turku players
Seinäjoen Jalkapallokerho players
Turun Palloseura footballers
Kotkan Työväen Palloilijat players
FC Ilves players
Kuopion Palloseura players
Veikkausliiga players
Kakkonen players
Ykkönen players